The Numero Group is an archival record label that creates compilations of previously released music, reissues original albums, and creates album reconstructions from a variety of musical genres. The label, known as Numero, was founded in 2003 by Rob Sevier, Ken Shipley (a former A&R manager for the equally eclectic Rykodisc label), and Tom Lunt. The label's focus since its 2003 founding has been to research and preserve obscure recorded material and ephemera by artists and entrepreneurs who found little commercial success upon their material's initial release.

In 2013, Numero became part of a partnership with Secretly Label Group.

History and mission
The label's first release was a reissue of rare soul and R&B music first released by the defunct Capsoul label, which was founded in Columbus, Ohio, by William Roger "Bill" Moss.

Here is the label's stated mission (according to their website at www.numerogroup.com):

The mission was simple: to dig deep into the recesses of our record collections with the goal of finding the dustiest gems begging to be released from their exile on geek street. No longer would $500 singles sit in a temperature-controlled room dying for a chance to be played. No more would the artists, writers, and entrepreneurs who made these records happen go unknown and unappreciated.

Releases
Similar to other reissue labels such as Rhino, Bear Family, Ace, Cherry Red, and Hip-O, Numero releases feature extensive liner notes and rare photographs that provide context for the associated recordings.  2009's Local Customs: Downriver Revival was expanded to include a DVD containing a documentary and an additional 200 recordings to "dig" through (which is, in spirit, similar to the "digital dig" section of their website).

Unlike most other reissue labels, Numero largely releases compilations. Shipley explained the reasons for this in a 2006 Pitchfork interview:

We consider our label to be a "cream of the crop" label. There are plenty of albums that we could do, but that's not what we are about as a company. We clean out all the bad stuff. We were like, ok, let's not be completists. If you're going to own a record of the [Miami soul] Deep City label, own our record. There are no duds.

For Record Store Day 2009, the Numero group produced a vinyl-only sampler named This LP Crashes Hard Drives, which included not only a track from an upcoming Numero release ("Sam" from 029 Pisces: A Lovely Sight), but also tracks from such labels as Light In The Attic, Honest Jon's, Now Again, Sublime Frequencies, Daptone Records, Jazzman, and Vampisoul.

Several tracks licensed for reissue by The Numero Group have made appearances in film and television. "You And Me" by Penny & The Quarters, which was featured on 2007's Eccentric Soul: The Prix Label compilation, was used in the 2010 film Blue Valentine. During the film's theatrical run, the identity of Penny & The Quarters was unknown and the Numero Group was actively seeking contact with band members or their relatives. Later, it was revealed that Penny of Penny & The Quarters had been Nannie Sharpe, née Coulter, whose daughter Jayma had heard from friends about the film's use of her mother's song. In 2012, Chuck and Mac's "Powerful Love"—which Numero included on 2007's Eccentric Soul: Twinight's Lunar Rotation compilation—made a prominent appearance in Rian Johnson's sci-fi action film Looper.

Awards
Numero Group releases have received eight Grammy Award Nominations. In 2009, Light: on the South Side Light: On The South Side - Trailer—featuring 100 black & white photographs by Michael Abramson taken during the mid-1970s on Chicago's south side—was nominated for Best Boxed Or Special Limited Edition Package. Syl Johnson: Complete Mythology was nominated for two Grammy Awards in 2011, for Best Album Notes and for Best Historical Album.

Grammy Awards
 V/A Light: On The South Side - Best Boxed or Special Limited Edition Package (2009 nominated)
 Syl Johnson Complete Mythology - Best Album Notes (2012 nominated)
 Syl Johnson Complete Mythology - Best Historical Album (2012 nominated)
 V/A Purple Snow: Forecasting the Minneapolis Sound - Best Album Notes (2015 nominated)
 V/A Ork Records: New York, New York - Best Historical Album (2017 nominated)
 V/A Ork Records: New York, New York - Best Album Notes (2017 nominated)
 V/A Bobo Yeye: Belle Epoque in Upper Volta - Best Historical Album (2018 nominated)
 Jackie Shane Any Other Way - Best Historical Album (2019 nominated)

A2IM Libera Awards
 Syl Johnson "I'm Talking About Freedom" (Nike Free SB Commercial) - Best Sync Usage (2015 finalist)
 Various Artists Warfaring Strangers: Darkscorch Canticles - Creative Packaging Award (2015 finalist)
 Scharpling & Wurster The Best of the Best Show - Creative Packaging Award (2016 finalist)
 V/A Ork Records: New York, New York - Creative Packaging Award (2016 finalist)
 Bobo Yéyé Belle Époque in Upper Volta - Creative Packaging (2017 finalist)

AIM Independent Music Awards
 V/A Purple Snow: Forecasting the Minneapolis Sound - Special Catalogue Release of the Year (2014 WON)
 V/A Warfaring Strangers: Darkscorch Canticles - Special Catalogue Release of the Year (2015 WON)

Ongoing series

Yellow Pills: Prefill overlooked power pop songs from 1976-1982. Collaborated in homage to the 90's 'Yellow Pills' UK compilations. 
Eccentric Soul: obscure soul and funk, generally focusing on a particular, small label 
Cult Cargo: foreign interpretations of American music genres 
Good God!: religious soul and funk 
Local Customs: a document of an area's music scene, typically centered around one particular studio 
Wayfaring Strangers: folk music, usually from privately pressed LPs

See also 
 List of record labels
 Reissue labels
 Marion Black

References

Further reading
 "Hidden Tracks; Record sleuths reissue lost songs by Brian Raferty" November 2013, Wired page 92

External links
 
 2010 interview with Ken Shipley
 Peisner, David. "Diggin' Beyond the Crates," Spin, September 27, 2012. Accessed July 7, 2014.

American record labels
Reissue record labels